The 1901 Kilkenny Senior Hurling Championship was the 13th staging of the Kilkenny Senior Hurling Championship since its establishment by the Kilkenny County Board.

On 27 October 1901, Tullaroan won the championship after a 5-10 to 3-07 defeat of Threecastles in the final. This was their sixth championship title overall and their first in two championship seasons.

Results

Final

References

Kilkenny Senior Hurling Championship
Kilkenny Senior Hurling Championship